Right To Know is a non profit support project for those who discover via genealogical genetic testing that their lineage is not what they had supposed it to be due to family secrets and misattributed parentage,  thus raising existential issues of adoption, race, ethnicity, culture, rape, etc.

References

Organizations established in 2022
 2022 establishments in the United States
 Genetics

External links

 Right To Know - Your Genetic Identity